Journey for Survival is a 1981 American short documentary film directed by Dick Young. It was nominated for an Academy Award for Best Documentary Short.

References

External links
Journey for Survival at the United Nations Audiovisual Library

1981 films
1981 short films
1981 documentary films
American short documentary films
1980s short documentary films
1980s English-language films
1980s American films